A general election was held in the U.S. state of Nebraska on November 6, 2018. All of Nebraska's executive officers were up for election as well as a United States Senate seat, and all of Nebraska's three seats in the United States House of Representatives.

Governor and Lieutenant Governor

Incumbent Republican Governor Pete Ricketts ran for re-election to a second term.
Republican state senator Bob Krist announced that he would give up his party affiliation and run for governor as a Democrat.

Pete Ricketts defeated Bob Krist in the general election.

Attorney general

Incumbent Republican attorney general Doug Peterson ran for re-election to a second term.

Republican primary
 Doug Peterson, Incumbent Attorney general

Results

Democratic primary
 Evangelos Argyrakis, Omaha Attorney general

Results

General election
Withdrawal 
Omaha Attorney Evangelos Argyrakis, ran in the Democratic primary. However, after being charged with felony strangulation following an altercation with his 82-year-old father on April 8, 2018, Nebraska Democratic Party called on him to step aside, which he did on June 25, 2018. This left Peterson running unopposed in the general election.

Results

Secretary of State

Incumbent Republican Secretary of State John Gale, who was appointed to the position in December 2000, has announced he will not run for re-election.

Republican primary

Candidates
Declared
 Bob Evnen, attorney and former member of the Nebraska State Board of Education
 Debra Perrell

Potential
 Jim Smith, state senator

Declined
 John Murante, state senator (running for state treasurer)
 Tyson Larson, state senator

Results

Democratic primary

Candidates
Declared
Spencer Danner, former head of the City of Omaha's Human Rights and Relations Department. He opposes voter ID laws, stating that the state should focus instead on modernizing the election system. 
Declined
 Jane Raybould, Lincoln City Councilwoman, former Lancaster County Commissioner and nominee for lieutenant governor in 2014 (running for U.S. Senate)
 Adam Morfeld, state senator (running for legislature)
 Chris Rodgers, Douglas County Commissioner
 Katie Weitz, nonprofit executive

Results

General election
Governing magazine projected the race as "safe Republican".

Results

State Treasurer
Incumbent Republican Nebraska State Treasurer Don Stenberg is term-limited and is not eligible to run for re-election to a third term.

Republican primary
State Senator John Murante ran for the Republican nomination.  He faced off against Taylor Royal in the Republican primary.

John Murante defeated Taylor Royal in the Republican primary, and ran unopposed in the general election.

Auditor of Public Accounts
Incumbent Republican Auditor of Public Accounts of Nebraska Charlie Janssen ran for re-election to a second term.

State Board of Education

Public Service Commission

District 1
Nebraska Public Service Commission District 1 incumbent Republican Frank Landis, who was first elected in 1988, has not announced whether he will run for re-election to a sixth term.

District 3
Nebraska Public Service Commission District 3 incumbent Republican Tim Schram, who was first elected in 2006, ran for re-election to a third term.

State Legislature

Nebraska's state legislature is unique among American states in that it is unicameral, meaning that it is only one chamber. Consisting of 49 legislative districts, the Nebraska State Legislature had 24 seats up for election in 2018.

United States Senate

Incumbent Republican senator Deb Fischer ran for re-election to a second term. She faced Democratic challenger Jane Raybould. Fischer defeated Raybould in the general election.

United States House of Representatives

All of Nebraska's three seats in the United States House of Representatives were up for election in 2018.

In District 2, Republican Incumbent Don Bacon ran for re-election. Kara Eastman defeated Brad Ashford, who held the seat prior to losing to Bacon in 2016, in the Democratic primary.

Don Bacon defeated Kara Eastman in the general election.

References

External links
Candidates at Vote Smart 
Candidates at Ballotpedia
Campaign finance at OpenSecrets

Official Attorney General campaign websites
Doug Peterson (R) for Attorney General

Official Secretary of State campaign websites
Spencer Danner (D) for Secretary of State
Bob Evnen (R) for Secretary of State

Official State Treasurer campaign websites
John Murante (R) for Treasurer

Official Auditor of Public Accounts campaign websites
Charlie Janssen (R) for Auditor
Jane Skinner (D) for Auditor

Official Public Service Commission district 1 campaign websites
Dan Watermeier (R) for Public Service Commissioner
Christa Yoakum (D) for Public Service Commissioner

Official Public Service Commission district 3 campaign websites
Mike Forsythe (D) for Public Service Commissioner
Tim Schram (R) for Public Service Commissioner

 
Nebraska